Mikhail Petrovich Zubchuk (22 November 1967 – 9 November 2015) was a Russian footballer.

References

1967 births
2015 deaths
Footballers from Moscow
Soviet footballers
PFC CSKA Moscow players
MFC Mykolaiv players
FC Metalurh Zaporizhzhia players
FC Kryvbas Kryvyi Rih players
Russian footballers
FC Nyva Vinnytsia players
Russian expatriate footballers
Expatriate footballers in Ukraine
Ukrainian Premier League players
Expatriate footballers in Moldova
FC Saturn Ramenskoye players
FC Fakel Voronezh players
Russian Premier League players
FC Arsenal Tula players
FC Lada-Tolyatti players
FC Torpedo NN Nizhny Novgorod players
FC Metallurg Lipetsk players
FC Yenisey Krasnoyarsk players
FC Tighina players
Association football forwards
FC Torpedo Moscow players
FC Dynamo Vologda players
FC Asmaral Moscow players